Niubeishan is a town in  Yingjing County in western Sichuan province, China, located  west of the county seat. , it has four villages under its administration.

Before 2017 it was known as Sanhe Township (三合乡).

References 

Towns in Sichuan
Yingjing County